Yokkao Boxing is a Muay Thai brand based in Thailand.

History
YOKKAO was founded in Bangkok on 1 January 2010 by Philip Villa and Doungjaj Tananan. It began by producing Muay Thai shorts and training equipment. In February 2011, YOKKAO started the YOKKAO Fight Team which sponsors Muay Thai Fighters around the world. The earliest line-up of the fight team included Buakaw Banchamek, Yoddecha Sityodtong, Jordan Watson, Sudsakorn Sor Klinmee, Saenchai P.K. Saenchai, Dzhabar Askerov, Cedric Muller and Liam Harrison. They also partnered up with Muay Thai camps such as Sityodtong.

In November 2011, the company started Muay Thai fight promotion by holding preliminary selections where winners would go on to fight at the first major YOKKAO fight event. The show was titled YOKKAO Extreme and took place on 21 January 2012 at the Forum di Assago in Milan, Italy. The fight events were later briefly titled Muay Thai Combat Mania YOKKAO due to the partnership with Muay Thai Combat before, shortening to the current name with the 9th event on 24 May 2014.

On 11 October 2014, YOKKAO World Titles for 65k g and 70 kg were introduced at YOKKAO 10 & 11. Pakorn defeated Greg Wootton while Jordan Watson took a KO win over Mickael Piscitello to become the first YOKKAO World Champions at 65 kg and 70 kg respectively.

YOKKAO has held fight events in Italy, UK, Hong Kong, China, Argentina, Australia, Mexico and Thailand.

YOKKAO signed more fighters into its team over the years including Singdam Kiatmoo9, Pakorn PKSaenchaiMuayThaiGym, Tetsuya Yamato, Manachai, and Yodchai.

On 1 January 2019, YOKKAO updated its logo design.

In November 2020, YOKKAO founder, Philip Villa announced over social media the signing of Rodtang Jitmuangnon, Nuenglanlek Jitmuangnon and Sakaengam Jitmuangnon under a 3-year sponsorship deal.

In February 2021, YOKKAO signed female Muay Thai champions Duangdawnoi Looksaikongdin and Aida Looksaikongdin as well as transgender fighter, Nong Rose Baan Charoensuk.

In March 2021, YOKKAO signed Glory Kickboxing world champion, Petpanomrung Kiatmuu9.

Business model
YOKKAO has training centers around the world through partnership in local gyms. Locations include Australia, Canada, Argentina, the UK, the Republic of San Marino, Croatia, Bahrain, Hong Kong, China, Korea, Malaysia, and Thailand.

Since 2011, YOKKAO has held over 70 seminars around the world where participants learn Muay Thai techniques with fighters from their fight team and trainers.

In September 2013, YOKKAO announced the start of YOKKAO fight events in the UK. The events started formally with YOKKAO 8 on 8 March 2014, at the Macron Stadium in Bolton, UK. The stadium has since become a regular venue for YOKKAO events in the UK.

In June 2015, YOKKAO opened a factory in Samut Prakan, which also houses their office and a shop.

In early 2016, the company opened the first YOKKAO Training Center in Bangkok. It's located in the centralised district of Sukhumvit and is the official training camp for the YOKKAO fight team.

In February 2017, YOKKAO was featured on CNN for using social media in driving the brand's global exposure.

In July 2017, the company announced the establishment of an YOKKAO warehouse in Republic of San Marino.

On 29 October 2018, YOKKAO hosted its first WBC title fight where Manachai fought against Julio Lobo from Brazil for the vacant WBC Muay Thai world welterweight title on YOKKAO 34 in Hong Kong. Manachai won the fight by decision to clinch the championship belt.

On 8 April 2019, YOKKAO announced that it will host its official event for the first time in Sydney, Australia.

On 18 April 2019, YOKKAO announced the launch of its fighter management branch, YOKKAO Agency.

On 27 July 2019, YOKKAO held its first Ireland event in Dublin where Singdam fought against Craig Coakley for the WBC Muay Thai Diamond Super-Lightweight title. Singdam won the fight via decision to clinch the WBC diamond belt.

In August and September 2019, YOKKAO went on a 3-week seminar tour in the US with Saenchai, Spencer Brown, Yodchai and Kru Jack where they visited 20 gyms in 20 different cities.

In August 2019, YOKKAO also launched its third global warehouse in Las Vegas, USA with product distribution managed by Domita LLC for the North American region.

In September 2022, YOKKAO resumed their Seminar Tour with a month-long event throughout the United States. The tour included Saenchai, Superlek, and Kru Fasai.

Past events

Champions

Diamond champions

World champions

Current champions

-65kg

-70kg

Training center
YOKKAO Training Center Bangkok is the official YOKKAO gym located in the downtown of Bangkok, Thailand. It was opened in 2016 when it became the home and training camp of the YOKKAO Thailand Fight Team. The gym is also opened to the public for training.

YOKKAO Training Center Bangkok has hosted professional fighters and celebrities for Muay Thai training including UK Muay Thai fighter, Liam Harrison, Joe Jonas and Cole Whittle of American pop band DNCE, and fashion model Mia Kang.

Fight team
  Saenchai
  Singdam YOKKAOSaenchaiGym
  Yodchai YOKKAOSaenchaiGym
  Superlek Kiatmuu9
  Petpanomrung Kiatmuu9
  Rodtang Jitmuangnon
  Nuenglanlek Jitmuangnon
  Sakaengam Jitmuangnon
  Liam Harrison
  Spencer Brown
  Tetsuya Yamato

Agency fighters
  Saenchai
  Singdam
  Yodchai
  Manachai
  Superlek Kiatmuu9
  Petpanomrung Kiatmuu9
  Rodtang Jitmuangnon
  Nuenglanlek Jitmuangnon
  Sakaengam Jitmuangnon
  Spencer Brown

Notable alumni 

  Buakaw Banchamek
  Saenchai
  Singdam Kiatmuu9
  Sudsakorn Sor Klinmee
  Yodsanklai Fairtex
  Pakorn PKSaenchaimuaythaigym
  Superlek Kiatmuu9
  Manachai
  Kem Sitsongpeenong
  Sitthichai Sitsongpeenong
  Phetmorakot Wor Sangprapai
  Rungravee Sasiprapa
  Aikpracha Meenayothin
  Liam Harrison
  Daniel McGowan
 Jordan Watson
  Spencer Brown
  Tim Thomas (kickboxer)
  Fabio Pinca
  Houcine Bennoui
  Karim Bennoui
  Mickaël Piscitello
  Giorgio Petrosyan
  Armen Petrosyan
  Marco Piqué
  Sanny Dahlbeck
  Andy Souwer
  Abraham Roqueñi
  Ognjen Topic
  Dzhabar Askerov
  Tetsuya Yamato
  Yi Long
  Qiu Jianliang
  Fang Bian
  Dzhabar Askerov
  Frank Giorgi
  Jonathan Haggerty
  Craig Coakley

See also

List of fitness wear brands
List of companies of Thailand

References

External links
Official Website

Thai brands
Sportswear brands
Sporting goods brands
Sporting goods manufacturers of Thailand
Professional Muay Thai organizations